Dorothy Round defeated Helen Jacobs in the final, 6–2, 5–7, 6–3 to win the ladies' singles tennis title at the 1934 Wimbledon Championships.

Helen Moody was the defending champion, but did not compete.

Seeds

  Helen Jacobs (final)
  Dorothy Round (champion)
  Sarah Palfrey (quarterfinals)
  Hilde Sperling (fourth round)
  Peggy Scriven (quarterfinals)
  Lolette Payot (quarterfinals)
  Cilly Aussem (quarterfinals)
  Simonne Mathieu (semifinals)

Draw

Finals

Top half

Section 1

Section 2

Section 3

Section 4

Bottom half

Section 5

Section 6

Section 7

Section 8

References

External links

Women's Singles
Wimbledon Championship by year – Women's singles
Wimbledon Championships - singles
Wimbledon Championships - singles